Pierre-Antoine-Augustin (17 September 1755, Paris22 May 1832, Paris), chevalier de Piis was a French dramatist and man of letters.  With Pierre-Yves Barré he was one of the co-founders of Paris's Théâtre du Vaudeville.

He was the son of Pierre-Joseph de Piis, chevalier de Saint-Louis and major to the Cap Français, and as such was intended for service in France's colonial army.  However, due to his delicate health, he gave up the military and completed at the collège d'Harcourt the studies he had begun at the Louis le-Grand.

Sources 
 Ferdinand Hoefer, Nouvelle biographie générale, t. 40, Paris, Firmin Didot, frères, 1862, .
 Louis Gustave Vapereau, Dictionnaire universel des littératures, Paris, Hachette, 1876,

External links 
 

Writers from Paris
1755 births
1832 deaths
19th-century French dramatists and playwrights
Police officers from Paris